Virtual Viking – The Ambush is a 2019 short film directed by Erik Gustavson, using volumetric video capture to create one of the first films in virtual reality. Produced for The Viking Planet centre in Oslo, Norway, the film is part of a wider exhibition of the lives of Norse seafarers and uses a number of VR headsets to enable visitors to experience a Viking longship in the heat of battle.

Plot
Skald recounts the story of how he was captured, in his youth, during an unsuccessful Viking raid.

Cast
 Murray McArthur as Skald
 Luke White as Ulf
 Wolfie Hughes as Grim
 Christopher Rogers as Trym
 Ross O'Hennessy as Viking

Awards and nominations
At the Aesthetica Short Film Festival 2019, Virtual Viking – The Ambush was awarded Best VR Film.

References

External links
     

2019 films
Norwegian short films
Old Norse-language films
Head-mounted displays
Video game accessories
Virtual reality